Domenico Falco (born 3 May 1985) is an Italian former professional footballer who played in Serie B for Ascoli.

Biography
Born in Caserta, Campania, Falco started his career at northern Italy side Cittadella Padova. In mid-2004 he was transferred to Rosetana.

In mid-2005 he joined another Serie C2 team Foligno but from Ascoli in co-ownership deal. In January 2007 he returned to Ascoli Piceno but left for Massese in another co-ownership deal.

In June 2008 Ascoli bought back Falco. He only played twice in 2008–09 Serie B. In January 2009, he left for Vigor Lamezia on free transfer.

In July 2009 he left for Serie D team Casertana. In December, he left for Olympia Agnonese and in January 2010 left for Montebelluna.

International career
Falco was a member of Italy U-20 Serie C team in 2004–05 Mirop Cup. He also played in European Challenge Trophy on 30 November 2005.

References

External links
 Lega Serie B Profile by Panini Digital 
 Football.it Profile 
 LaSerieD.com Profile 

Italian footballers
A.S. Cittadella players
A.S.D. Città di Foligno 1928 players
Ascoli Calcio 1898 F.C. players
U.S. Massese 1919 players
Calcio Montebelluna players
Association football forwards
People from Caserta
1985 births
Living people
Footballers from Campania
Sportspeople from the Province of Caserta